The year 2008 is the 16th year in the history of Pancrase, a mixed martial arts promotion based in Japan. In 2008 Pancrase held 12 events beginning with Pancrase: Shining 1.

Title fights

Events list

Pancrase: Shining 1

Pancrase: Shining 1 was an event held on January 30, 2008 at Korakuen Hall in Tokyo, Japan.

Results

Pancrase: 2008 Neo-Blood Tournament Eliminations

Pancrase: 2008 Neo-Blood Tournament Eliminations was an event held on March 23, 2008 at Gold's Gym South Tokyo Annex in Tokyo, Japan.

Results

Pancrase: Shining 2

Pancrase: Shining 2 was an event held on March 26, 2008 at Korakuen Hall in Tokyo, Japan.

Results

Pancrase: Shining 3

Pancrase: Shining 3 was an event held on April 27, 2008 at Differ Ariake Arena in Tokyo, Japan.

Results

Pancrase: Shining 4

Pancrase: Shining 4 was an event held on May 25, 2008 at Azelea Taisho Hall in Osaka, Osaka, Japan.

Results

Pancrase: Shining 5

Pancrase: Shining 5 was an event held on June 1, 2008 at Korakuen Hall in Tokyo, Japan.

Results

Pancrase: Real 2008

Pancrase: Real 2008 was an event held on June 29, 2008 at Tenkaichi Stadium in Okinawa, Japan.

Results

Pancrase: Shining 6

Pancrase: Shining 6 was an event held on August 27, 2008 at Korakuen Hall in Tokyo, Japan.

Results

Pancrase: Shining 7

Pancrase: Shining 7 was an event held on September 7, 2008  in Osaka, Osaka, Japan.

Results

Pancrase: Shining 8

Pancrase: Shining 8 was an event held on October 1, 2008 at Korakuen Hall in Tokyo, Japan.

Results

Pancrase: Shining 9

Pancrase: Shining 9 was an event held on October 26, 2008 at Differ Ariake Arena in Tokyo, Japan.

Results

Pancrase: Shining 10

Pancrase: Shining 10 was an event held on December 7, 2008 at Differ Ariake Arena in Tokyo, Japan.

Results

See also 
 Pancrase
 List of Pancrase champions
 List of Pancrase events

References

Pancrase events
2008 in mixed martial arts